Common bluetail may refer to any of several damselfly species:

 Ischnura senegalensis, in Africa and the Middle East
 Ischnura heterosticta, in Australia
 Ischnura elegans, the blue-tailed damselfly, in Europe